Tsering Landol is an Indian gynecologist and one of the pioneers of women's health in the Ladakh Union Territory of India. She served at the Sonam Norboo Memorial Government Hospital, Leh and is also associated with other educational institutions. The Government of India awarded her the fourth highest civilian honour of the Padma Shri, in 2006, and Padma Bhusan in 2020 for her contributions to Indian medicine, making her one of the few woman recipients of the award from Jammu and Kashmir and the first Ladakhi woman doctor to receive the honour. She is also featured on the 'Wall of Fame' which features those who have exhibited excellence throughout their career or existence have exemplified glory and greatness. The Wall recognizes those individuals and teams which have attained high achievement and/or made a significant contribution to society.  Landol is featured in The Song Collector, a documentary film on the life of the renowned Ladakhi folk musician, Morup Namgyal. She was awarded Padma Bhushan, the third highest civilian award in India in the year 2020.

See also 

 Morup Namgyal

References 

Living people
Recipients of the Padma Bhushan in medicine
Recipients of the Padma Shri in medicine
Year of birth missing (living people)
Indian gynaecologists
Indian women gynaecologists
20th-century Indian women scientists
20th-century Indian medical doctors
20th-century Indian educational theorists
Ladakhi people
People from Ladakh
Medical doctors from Jammu and Kashmir
Indian women educational theorists
Women scientists from Jammu and Kashmir
Women educators from Jammu and Kashmir
Educators from Jammu and Kashmir
20th-century women physicians
20th-century women educators